San Giorgio, is the Italian form of Saint George. When used as the name of a person it is frequently contracted to Sangiorgio.

Places

Comuni
Many towns and villages are named after the saint, including the following comuni, or municipalities:

 Carrara San Giorgio, one of two constituent municipalities of Due Carrare in the Province of Padua
 Castel San Giorgio, in the Province of Salerno
 Monforte San Giorgio, in the Province of Messina
 Porto San Giorgio, in the Province of Fermo
 San Giorgio a Cremano, in the Province of Napoli
 San Giorgio a Liri, in the Province of Frosinone
 San Giorgio Albanese, in the Province of Cosenza
 San Giorgio Canavese, in the Province of Torino
 San Giorgio del Sannio, in the Province of Benevento
 San Giorgio della Richinvelda, in the Province of Pordenone
 San Giorgio delle Pertiche, in the Province of Padova
 San Giorgio di Lomellina, in the Province of Pavia
 San Giorgio di Mantova, in the Province of Mantova
 San Giorgio di Nogaro, in the Province of Udine
 San Giorgio di Pesaro, in the Province of Pesaro e Urbino
 San Giorgio di Piano, in the Province of Bologna
 San Giorgio in Bosco, in the Province of Padova
 San Giorgio Ionico, in the Province of Taranto
 San Giorgio la Molara, in the Province of Benevento
 San Giorgio Lucano, in the Province of Matera
 San Giorgio Monferrato, in the Province of Alessandria
 San Giorgio Morgeto, in the Province of Reggio Calabria
 San Giorgio Piacentino, in the Province of Piacenza
 San Giorgio Scarampi, in the Province of Asti
 San Giorgio su Legnano, in the Province of Milano
 Torre San Giorgio, in the Province of Cuneo
 Giurgiu, Romania, which some claim is named for Saint George

Frazione
 San Giorgio (Cascia), in the Province of Perugia

Geography
Monte San Giorgio, a Swiss mountain
San Giorgio in Alga, an island of the Venetian lagoon
San Giorgio Maggiore, an island in Venice

Buildings
Churches bearing this dedication include:
The Pieve di San Giorgio, Argenta
San Giorgio, Brescia, a church near Porta Bruciata, in Brescia, Lombardy
San Giorgio (Siena), a church in Siena
San Giorgio al Palazzo, Milan
San Giorgio dei Greci, Venice
San Giorgio di Nogaro Friuli Venezia Giulia
San Giorgio in Braida, Verona
San Giorgio in Poggiale, Bologna, a deconsecrated church and now art and history library in Bologna
San Giorgio in Velabro, Rome
Church of San Giorgio Maggiore, Venice
San Giorgio Cathedral, Modica, mother church of Modica, Province of Ragusa, Sicily
Duomo of San Giorgio, Ragusa, a church in Ragusa Ibla, Sicily
Scuola di San Giorgio degli Schiavoni, a confraternity house in Venice

Other buildings with the name:
San Giorgio Monastery, Venice
Palazzo San Giorgio, Genoa

People
People with the name San Giorgio or Sangiorgio include:
The Master of the Antiphonal Q of San Giorgio Maggiore (active between 1440 and 1470), an Italian painter of illuminated manuscripts
Giovanni Antonio Sangiorgio (died 1509), Italian canon lawyer and Cardinal of Alessandria
Eusebio da San Giorgio (c.1470–c.1550), an Italian painter
Abbondio Sangiorgio (1798–1879), a Milanese sculptor

Business
Banco di San Giorgio (1987–2012), an Italian bank
Bank of Saint George (Italian: Casa delle compere e dei banchi di San Giorgio), the oldest chartered bank, established in 1407
San Giorgio pasta, founded in Lebanon, PA in 1914; acquired by Hershey Foods in 1966; acquired by Riviana Foods Inc. in 2017.

Transportation
San Giorgio (Genoa Metro), a metro station on the Genoa Metro
Italian cruiser San Giorgio, an armored cruiser of the Regia Marina in the early 20th century
 San Giorgio class amphibious transport dock, an Italian Navy amphibious landing ship
 Viadotto Genova-San Giorgio, a viaduct in Genoa, Italy.

Other
Compagnia di San Giorgio, the name of several groups of 14th century Italian mercenaries
San Giorgio Maggiore at Dusk (Monet), a 1908 oil painting by Claude Monet

See also 

San Giorgio Maggiore (disambiguation)